Wiesław Myśliwski (born 25 March 1932 in Dwikozy, near Sandomierz) is a Polish novelist.

Biography
He was born to a middle class family and raised in Ćmielów, where his father had participated in the Polish-Soviet War and became a local official after being demobilized.

After the war, he attended secondary schools in Sandomierz; graduating in 1951. He then studied philology at the Catholic University of Lublin, taking his degree in 1956.

From 1976 to 1999, he was Editor-in-chief of the cultural quarterly Regiony, and later contributed to the literary bi-weekly . Since 1997, he has chaired the jury for the  prize. He was a member of the Polish Writers' Union from 1971 to 1983.

Works
In his novels and plays Myśliwski concentrates on life in the Polish countryside. He is a two-time winner of the Nike Award (Polish equivalent of the Booker Prize) for Horizon (1996) and A Treatise on Shelling Beans (2006).

His first novel translated into English was The Palace, rendered by Ursula Phillips. Bill Johnston's English translation of Kamień na kamieniu, published by Archipelago Books as Stone Upon Stone, won the 2012 Best Translated Book Award.

Bibliography
1967 Nagi sad
1970 Pałac (translated by Ursula Phillips as The Palace in 1991)
1973 Złodziej
1978 Klucznik
1984 Kamień na kamieniu (translated by Bill Johnston as Stone Upon Stone in 2011)
1988 Drzewo
1996 Widnokrąg
2000 Requiem dla gospodyni
2006 Traktat o łuskaniu fasoli (translated by Bill Johnston as A Treatise on Shelling Beans in 2013)
2013 Ostatnie rozdanie
2018 Ucho Igielne

Awards and honors

1996 Nike Award, Widnokrąg
2005 Golden Medal for Merit to Culture - Gloria Artis
2006 Nike Award, Traktat o łuskaniu fasoli
2007 Gdynia Literary Prize, Widnokrąg
2012 Best Translated Book Award, Stone Upon Stone (Kamień na kamieniu) 
2012 PEN Translation Prize, Stone Upon Stone

References

Polish male writers
1932 births
Living people
Nike Award winners